West Creek Township is one of eleven townships in Lake County, Indiana. As of the 2010 census, its population was 6,826 and it contained 2,664 housing units.

History
West Creek Township was founded in 1839. It took its name from the westernmost of three large streams in the vicinity.

Geography
The township includes a small portion of the incorporated town of Lowell, as well as the town of Schneider.

Education
West Creek Township, along with Cedar Creek Township and Eagle Creek Township, is served by the Tri-Creek School Corporation which includes Lowell High School.

References

External links
 Indiana Township Association
 United Township Association of Indiana

Townships in Lake County, Indiana
Townships in Indiana
populated places established in 1839
1839 establishments in Indiana